New People's Party may refer to:

 Liberal People's Party (Norway) (Det Nye Folkepartiet), political party in Norway
 Liberals (Sweden), political party in Sweden
 Sinmindang (disambiguation)
 New People's Party of Korea, a predecessor of North Korea's ruling Workers' Party of Korea
 New Democratic Party (South Korea), opposition party that existed from 1963 to 1980
 New People's Party (South Korea), formed in 2016
 New People's Party (Hong Kong), political party in Hong Kong

See also
 New Power Party
 People's New Party of Japan
 People's Party (South Korea, 2016)